Henryk Spodzieja (21 October 1919 – 27 June 1975) was a Polish footballer. He played in nine matches for the Poland national football team from 1947 to 1949.

References

External links
 

1919 births
1975 deaths
Polish footballers
Poland international footballers
Place of birth missing
Association footballers not categorized by position